Super People (stylized as SUPER PEOPLE) is a battle royale game developed by South Korean studio Wonder People, and published by Wonder Games. Directed by Seong Gon Park, the debut title gained widespread popularity on Steam, with 4.3 million players participating in its closed beta test in February 2022.  A final closed beta test for the game concluded on August 30, 2022, before the game finally launched in Early Access on October 8, 2022..

Gameplay 
Super People is a player versus player, class-based shooter, set on the fictional island of Orb Island. Similar in gameplay to battle royale titles PUBG: Battlegrounds or Fortnite, players parachute into the map with limited supplies to engage in a large-scale, elimination-style deathmatch, until one player or one team remains. Once on the ground, players can craft or scavenge for weapons and gear, which can differ in type and quality. Players are given the option to freely toggle between first-person and third-person viewpoints.

Classes 
Unique to Super People, players are randomly assigned to one of thirteen character classes, with an option to reroll in exchange for in-game gold. As of the most-recent beta, players have access to the following classes:

 Driver: A vehicle specialist that can summon vehicles and modify them as projectiles.
 Firearms Expert: A gunfight-focused class that can slow down time and operate a force field. 
 Gas Soldier: A flamethrower specialist whose chemical weapons circumvent barriers.
 Gatling Soldier: A gatling gun specialist that possesses high health, and the ability to dodge and provide focused fire.
 Marine: A stealth-focused class that is adept at swimming, with the ability to summon a radius of fog to impede enemy sight.
 Nuclear: An explosive weapons expert that can wield a tactical nuke or RPG, possessing the ability to detect enemy locations.
 Teleporter: A teleporting sharpshooter that can quickly recover teammates and use consumables.  
 Titan: A shield-focused class that can provide large cover to self or teammates.
 Seeker: A "lone wolf" class that can lay down booby traps, and has the ability to duck and slide.  
 Shotgun Master: A shotgun specialist that can throw flashbang grenades and jump to high places. 
 Sniper: A sniper rifle specialist that can sense enemy locations by using their heartbeat.
 Strike Force: An agility-focused class that can quickly sprint, maneuver, and surround enemies.
 Swat: An urban warfare specialist with a proficient use of parkour and SWAT combat tactics.
 Demolisher: The Demolisher Traverses the battlefield with multiple combat styles and explosive abilities. Capable of delivering explosive attacks with a 5-shooter Shoulder Launcher and a summonable RC car.

Story 
Players will assume the role of super soldiers, who are the product of a genetic enhancement program initially devised to aid humans on Mars. Granting superhuman abilities, the enhancement technology quickly attracts the attention of rogue agents and criminals, who infiltrate the elite group of soldiers and sow discord. With declining morale and a looming terrorist threat, the super soldiers fracture and turn on one another, resulting in the ongoing conflict on the proxy settlement of Orb Island.

Development 
Super People was first announced in a game reveal trailer on July 16, 2021. It is expected to launch as a free-to-play early access game. In response to player feedback a final closed beta test was available in late August 2022, featuring daily tournaments and a $75,000 (USD) cash prize pool for top players.

External links 

 GeeGee.net

References 

Upcoming video games
Battle royale games
Multiplayer video games
Windows-only games
Video games developed in South Korea
First-person shooters